Princess Alexandra of Greece and Denmark;  – ), later known as Grand Duchess Alexandra Georgievna of Russia, was a member of the Greek royal family and of the Russian imperial family. She was the daughter of George I of Greece and Olga Constantinovna of Russia. She died of childbirth complications.

Early life
She was the third child and eldest daughter of King George I of Greece and his wife, Grand Duchess Olga Constantinovna of Russia. Alexandra's father was not a native Greek, but he had been born a Danish prince named Christian Wilhelm of Schleswig-Holstein-Sonderburg-Glücksburg, a son of Christian IX, King of Denmark, and he had been elected to the Greek throne at the age of seventeen. Five of his sons (Constantine, George, Nicholas, Andrew and Christopher), and two daughters (Alexandra and Maria), attained adulthood.

The Greek royal family was not wealthy by royal standards and they lived with simplicity. King George was a taciturn man, but contrary to the general approach of the time, he believed in happy rambunctious children. The long corridors of the royal palace in Athens were used by Alexandra and her siblings for all types of play and sometimes a "bike ride" would be led by the King himself. Raised by British nannies, English was the children's first language, but they spoke Greek between themselves. They also learned German and French.

Alexandra, nickname "Aline" within her family, or Greek Alix, to distinguish her from her aunt and godmother, Alexandra, Princess of Wales, had a sunny disposition and was much loved by her family. "She had one of those sweet and lovable natures that endeared her to everybody who came in touch with her," recalled her brother, Nicholas. "She looked young and beautiful, and ever since she was a child, life looked as it had nothing but joy and happiness in store for her."

Alexandra's playmates were her brother Nicholas and her sister Maria, who followed her in age. Alexandra spent many holidays in Denmark visiting her paternal grandparents. In Denmark, Alexandra and her siblings met their Russian and British cousins in large family gatherings.

Marriage and children

When she was eighteen years old, she was married to Grand Duke Paul Alexandrovich of Russia, her maternal first cousin once removed and the youngest child and sixth son of Emperor Alexander II and his first wife, Princess Marie of Hesse and by Rhine. They had become close when Grand Duke Paul spent winters in Greece due to his frequent respiratory illnesses. The Greek royal family also frequently spent holidays with the Romanov family on visits to Russia or Denmark. Their engagement was announced on 10 November 1888.

They had two children:

 Grand Duchess Maria Pavlovna (1890–1958)
 Grand Duke Dmitri Pavlovich (1891–1942)

Death
Seven months into her second pregnancy, Alexandra took a walk with her friends on the bank of the Moskva River and jumped directly into a boat that was permanently moored there, but fell as she got in. The next day, she collapsed in the middle of a ball from violent labour pains. She gave birth to her son, Dimitri, lapsed into a fatal coma, and she died six days later in the Romanovs' estate Ilyinskoe near Moscow. The Grand Duchess was buried in the Peter and Paul Cathedral, St. Petersburg.  Her grieving husband had to be restrained from throwing himself into the grave with her.

Her husband later morganatically remarried Olga Karnovich.  Alexandra's son would be involved in the murder of Grigori Rasputin, a favorite of Tsarina Alexandra Feodorvna, in 1916.

In 1939 during the reign of her nephew George II of Greece, the Greek government obtained permission from the Soviet government under Joseph Stalin to rebury Princess Alexandra in Greece. Her body was removed from the vault in Leningrad and transferred by a Greek ship to Athens. It was finally laid to rest near the Tatoi Palace. Alexandra's marble tombstone over an empty tomb is still in its place in the Peter and Paul Cathedral.

The "Alexandra Maternity Hospital" (now "Alexandra General Hospital") in Athens was later named in her memory by another nephew, King Paul; it was affiliated with the University of Athens with a special remit to research and combat postpartum maternal mortality. Alexandras Avenue in Athens was also named after her.

Ancestry

Notes

References

Mager, Hugo (1998). Elizabeth: Grand Duchess of Russia. Carroll and Graf Publishers Inc. 
Zeepvat, Charlotte (2004). The Camera and the Tsars: A Romanov Family Album. Sutton Publishing Inc. 

Alexandra Georgievna of Russia
Alexandra Georgievna of Russia
Alexandra Georgievna of Russia
Alexandra Georgievna of Russia
Alexandra Georgievna of Russia
Alexandra Georgievna of Russia
Alexandra Georgievna of Russia
Alexandra Georgievna of Russia
Burials at Tatoi Palace Royal Cemetery
Daughters of kings